Eighteenth-Century Fiction is a quarterly peer-reviewed academic journal dedicated to the critical and historical investigation of literature and culture of the period 1660–1832. It is published by the University of Toronto Press.

Abstracting and indexing
The journal is abstracted and indexed in:
 Academic Search Elite
 Academic Search Premier
 Annual Bibliography of English Language and Literature
 Arts and Humanities Citations Index
 Canadian Business & Current Affairs (CBCA)
 Canadian Reference Centre
 China Education Publications Import & Export Corporation (CEPIEC)
 CrossRef
 Current Contents
 Current Contents—Arts and Humanities
 EJS EBSCO Electronic Journals Service
 Google Scholar
 Historical Abstracts
 Humanities International Index
 Microsoft Academic Search
 MLA International Bibliography
 Project MUSE
 Scopus
 Ulrich’s Periodicals Directory

References

External links

University of Toronto Press academic journals
Quarterly journals
Publications established in 1988
English-language journals